Steward's Green is a small hamlet in the Epping Forest District in the county of Essex, England.

Location 
It is located near the hamlet of Fiddlers Hamlet and the town of Epping.

Transport 
For transport there is the Epping tube station; and nearby are the M25 motorway and M11 motorway motorways, although there is no nearby access from either motorway.

Hamlets in Essex
Epping, Essex